Frederick L. "Fred" or "Tiny" Fayers (21 September 1890 – 4 February 1954) was an English footballer. He was born in King's Lynn, Norfolk, and died in Huddersfield, Yorkshire. A central defender or right half, Fayers played at amateur level for Northern Nomads, St Albans City, Watford and Huddersfield Town. He turned professional six months after joining Huddersfield. Following the resumption of peacetime football in 1918, Fayers played professionally for Stockport County, Manchester City and Halifax Town, whom he also coached. During his time at Watford and Huddersfield, Fayers represented England nine times at amateur level, scoring three goals.

References

1890 births
1954 deaths
Sportspeople from King's Lynn
English footballers
English Football League players
Association football central defenders
Huddersfield Town A.F.C. players
Watford F.C. players
St Albans City F.C. players
Stockport County F.C. players
Manchester City F.C. players
FC Halifax Town players
Northern Nomads F.C. players